Guillaume Khous (born 18 August 1992) is a professional footballer who plays for as a midfielder for  club Sedan. Born in France, he is a former Liechtenstein youth international.

Club career
Born in Tremblay-en-France, Khous graduated from US Torcy's youth setup, and made his senior debuts with JA Drancy in Championnat de France amateur. On 23 May 2011, he joined RC Lens, being assigned to the reserves in the same division.

Despite appearing regularly, Khous failed to score during his one-year spell at Lens, and subsequently returned to Drancy. In January 2013 he moved abroad, joining Nemzeti Bajnokság II side Szigetszentmiklósi TK, being an ever-present figure during the one and a half seasons at the club.

On 19 August 2014, Khous moved teams and countries again, signing for Spanish Segunda División B side Sestao River.

After a further two-season spell with Drancy, Khous signed for Ligue 2 Paris FC in June 2017. He made his only first team appearance for the club in a 2017–18 Coupe de la Ligue defeat against Clermont Foot on 22 August 2017. On 14 September 2017, he returned to Drancy on loan for the rest of the season.

On 31 May 2019, after a further season with Drancy, Khous joined Bourg-en-Bresse on a two-year contract.

In June 2021, Khous signed for Villefranche.

On 9 June 2022, he moved to Sedan.

International career 
Having family origins in Liechtenstein, Khous is eligible to internationally represent this country. In March 2010, he accepted to play for the Liechtenstein U17 national team in a friendly match. After that, the Liechtenstein Football Association offered him to play for the senior national team; however, Khous declined.

References

External links

1992 births
Living people
French people of Liechtenstein descent
People with acquired Liechtenstein citizenship
Liechtenstein footballers
Liechtenstein youth international footballers
Association football forwards
French footballers
US Torcy players
RC Lens players
JA Drancy players
Paris FC players
Szigetszentmiklósi TK footballers
Sestao River footballers
Football Bourg-en-Bresse Péronnas 01 players
FC Villefranche Beaujolais players
CS Sedan Ardennes players
Segunda División B players
Championnat National players
Championnat National 2 players
Championnat National 3 players
Liechtenstein expatriate footballers
French expatriate footballers
French expatriate sportspeople in Hungary
Expatriate footballers in Hungary
French expatriate sportspeople in Spain
Expatriate footballers in Spain
People from Tremblay-en-France
Footballers from Seine-Saint-Denis